is a junction passenger railway station located in the city of  Hachiōji, Tokyo, Japan, operated by East Japan Railway Company (JR East). It opened on 11 August 1889.

Lines
The Chūō Main Line passes through Hachiōji Station, which is 47.4 kilometers from the terminus of the line at Tokyo Station. The Yokohama Line (to Higashi-Kanagawa) and Hachikō Line (to Komagawa) terminate here.

Keiō Hachiōji Station on the Keiō Line is located about 400 metres northeast from here.

Station layout
The station consists of three island platforms serving four tracks with the platforms connected the elevated station building. The station has a "Midori no Madoguchi" staffed ticket office.

Platforms

History
Hachiōji Station opened on 11 August 1889. With the privatization of Japanese National Railways (JNR) on 1 April 1987, the station came under the control of JR East.

Station numbering was introduced on 20 August 2016 with Hachioji being assigned station numbers JC22 for the Chuo Line and JH32 for the Yokohama Line.

Passenger statistics
In fiscal 2019, the station was used by an average of 83,565 passengers daily (boarding passengers only).

The passenger figures (boarding passengers only) for previous years are as shown below.

See also

 List of railway stations in Japan

References

External links

 Hachiōji Station information (JR East) 

Railway stations in Japan opened in 1889
Railway stations in Tokyo
Chūō Main Line
Hachikō Line
Yokohama Line
Stations of East Japan Railway Company
Hachiōji, Tokyo